Events from 2020 in American Samoa.

Incumbents 

 US House Delegate: Amata Coleman Radewagen
 Governor: Lolo Matalasi Moliga
 Lieutenant Governor: Lemanu Peleti Mauga

Events 
Ongoing – COVID-19 pandemic in Oceania

March 

 6 March – The government introduced new entry restrictions including restricting flight numbers and requiring travelers from Hawaii to spend 14 days in Hawaii and obtain a health clearance from health authorities.
 11 March – A government task-force was set up to deal with the virus and quarantining measures have been put in place for incoming visitors.
 14 March – Half of the 210 passengers on a returning Hawaiian Airlines flight were required to self-quarantine at home.
 16 March – Following a trip to the US mainland, Governor Lolo Matalasi Moliga self-isolated as a precautionary measure.
 26 March – Iulogologo Joseph Pereira, executive assistant to the governor and the head of the territory's COVID-19 task force, acknowledged that the territory did not have facilities to test samples of the COVID-19 virus, having to rely on testing facilities in Atlanta, Georgia.

April 

 19 April – U.S. President Donald Trump declared that a major disaster existed in the territory, responding to a request for help from Governor Lolo Matalasi Moliga on 13 April. This declaration makes the territory eligible for federal assistance to combat the spread of COVID-19. The US Federal Emergency Management Agency has named its Regional 9 administrator Robert Fenton Junior as the Coordinating Officer for any federal recovery operations in the territory.

Deaths

References 

2020 in American Samoa
2020s in American Samoa
Years of the 21st century in American Samoa
American Samoa